Married Love or Love in Marriage is a book by British academic Marie Stopes. It was one of the first books openly to discuss birth control.

The book begins by stating that "More than ever to-day are happy homes needed. It is my hope that this book may serve the State by adding to their number. Its object is to increase the joys of marriage, and to show how much sorrow may be avoided."

The preface states that a book geared to teaching married couples how to have a happy marriage, including 'great sex' – and it was thus offering a service to 'the State' by reducing the number of people affected by failed marriages.

The central question is how can the "desire for freedom" and "physical and mental exploration" be balanced with the limits of monogamy and raising a family. The answer is not "in the freedom to wander at will" but a "full and perfected love". In Stopes' lexicography love means sex and "access to the knowledge of how to cultivate it".

Publishing history 
Stopes had already published books based upon her work as a research scientist.  However, the publishers – both academic and mainstream – she approached for Married Love felt the subject matter too controversial and turned it down. Its publication was finally financed by Humphrey Roe, a Manchester businessman and birth control campaigner, who Stopes would later marry. Roe paid the £200 required by the small publishing firm Fifield & Co. who published Married Love in March 1918.

It rapidly sold out, and was in its sixth printing within a fortnight.

The US Customs Service banned the book as obscene until April 6, 1931, when Judge John M. Woolsey overturned that decision. Woolsey was the same judge who in 1933 would lift the ban on James Joyce's Ulysses, allowing for its publication and circulation in the United States of America.

It was the first book to note that women's sexual desire coincides with ovulation and the period right before menstruation. The book argued that marriage should be an equal relationship between partners. Although officially scorned in the UK, the book went through 19 editions and sales of almost 750,000 copies by 1931.

In 1935 a survey of American academics said Married Love was one of the 25 most influential books of the previous 50 years, ahead of Relativity by Albert Einstein, Interpretation of Dreams by Sigmund Freud, Mein Kampf by Adolf Hitler and The Economic Consequences of the Peace by John Maynard Keynes.

The book was the basis for a 1923 British silent film adaptation Married Love directed by Alexander Butler.

In popular culture 
 Downton Abbey (Series 4, Episode 4): Housekeeper Mrs. Hughes (Phyllis Logan) says it is impossible for lady's maid Edna Braithwaite (Myanna Burring) to be pregnant because Edna owns a copy of Married Love, suggesting that she understands methods of birth control, and therefore could not be pregnant by Tom Branson (Allen Leech).
Downton Abbey (Series 5, Episodes 2, 3, and 6): In Episode 2 of the fifth series, Lady Mary (Michelle Dockery) has a copy of the book, which she uses to ensure her week-long dalliance with Lord Gillingham (Tom Cullen) has no "unwanted epilogue". In Episode 3 she asks for her lady's maid Anna Bates (Joanne Froggatt) to hide the book and the contraceptive device (most likely a cervical cap, which she had had Anna purchase according to the book's recommendation) in her home to avoid it being discovered in the house. In Episode 6 Anna's husband, John Bates (Brendan Coyle), discovers the device in their home, and is hurt by the prospect that his wife is trying to prevent them having children, which had been a topic of the series between them, but he is unaware that the book and device were being used by Lady Mary and not his wife. Only after a while did he realize that the device was Mary's and not Anna's.
 In Parade's End (Episode 5), a 2012 BBC miniseries, the character Valentine Wannop finds a copy of the book in the changing rooms at the school where she works as a games mistress. She discusses it with the rest of the school staff and decides to put it back, not confiscate it, to give the girls a chance to learn about sex before they are married.
 In The Giver of Stars by JoJo Moyes, Married Love is a "dirty book" being challenged at the packhorse library in the fictional town of Baileyville, Kentucky.

References

External links 

 Full text at the Digital Library of the University of Pennsylvania.
 Full text at the Internet Archive.
 

1918 non-fiction books
Non-fiction books about sexuality
First-wave feminism
Birth control
British non-fiction books
Censored books
Non-fiction books adapted into films